Jan Grodek or Jan Grodek of Sanok (end of 15th century - 1554), the son of the mayor of Sanok, was a nine-time rector of the Academy in Kraków, Poland between 1540 and 1552.

References

1554 deaths
Rectors of the Jagiellonian University
Year of birth unknown